Ryszard Piotr Cyroń also known as Richard Cyron (born 11 February 1965) is a Polish former professional footballer who played as a striker.

References

External links
 

1965 births
Living people
Sportspeople from Zabrze
Polish footballers
Association football forwards
Poland international footballers
Bundesliga players
2. Bundesliga players
Hamburger SV players
Fortuna Düsseldorf players
Rot-Weiss Essen players
Górnik Zabrze players
Polish expatriate footballers
Polish expatriate sportspeople in Germany
Expatriate footballers in Germany